Guzmania vanvolxemii is a species of flowering plant in the Bromeliaceae family. It is native to Ecuador and Colombia.

References

vanvolxemii
Flora of Ecuador
Flora of Colombia
Plants described in 1878
Taxa named by Carl Christian Mez
Taxa named by Édouard André